Sorata can refer to:

Places

 Sorata, Bolivia
 Sorata Municipality, Bolivia

Fictional characters

 Sorata Muon, from Mouse
 Sorata Arisugawa, from X
 Sorata Kanda, from ‘’The Pet Girl of Sakurasou’’

Biology 
 Sorata, a genus of spiders